Ché Mills (born 29 October 1982) is an English mixed martial artist who most recently competed in the Welterweight division of Cage Warriors. A professional competitor since 2003, he has also competed for the UFC, Cage Rage, BAMMA, and M-1 Global. He is the former Cage Rage British Welterweight Champion.

Mixed martial arts career
Spent early years training with Mark Weir.

Early career
Mills made his professional MMA debut in November 2003. After going 1-2 in his first three bouts, Mills amassed an impressive undefeated streak of 8-0 (1 NC) over the next three years. He was considered a top prospect in the UK and was invited to appear on The Ultimate Fighter.

The Ultimate Fighter
Mills appeared on the first episode of The Ultimate Fighter: United States vs. United Kingdom. However, he lost an elimination match via heel hook to the subsequent winner of the competition, James Wilks, and therefore was eliminated from the show.

Ultimate Fighting Championship
Mills signed a contract with Zuffa to fight against The Ultimate Fighter 13 alumni Chris Cope at UFC 138 on 5 November 2011 in Birmingham, England. He won his debut in impressive fashion, finishing Cope by TKO just 40 seconds into the first round and was awarded Knockout of the Night honours.

Mills next faced Rory MacDonald on 21 April 2012 at UFC 145. He lost the fight via TKO in the second round.

Mills defeated Duane Ludwig on 29 September 2012 at UFC on Fuel TV 5. The bout was stopped after Ludwig was unable to continue after tearing a knee ligament while attempting to defend a takedown in the opening round.

Mills then fought Matthew Riddle on 16 February 2013 at UFC on Fuel TV: Barão vs. McDonald. Mills lost the fight via split decision and was subsequently released from the promotion.

Post UFC
After his release from UFC, Mills fought current Cage Warriors and Cage Contender welterweight champion, Cathal Pendred. The fight was changed to a non-title fight as Mills failed to make weight and was subsequently docked 25% of his fight purse. Mills lost this fight via TKO.

After a 20-month layoff, Mills returns to action in Italy, under the Venator Fighting Championship banner, in a scheduled match against Italian prospect Roberto Rigamonti. to take place on 21 May 2016 in Turin, Italy

Championships and accomplishments

Mixed Martial Arts
Cage Rage 
Cage Rage British Welterweight Champion
Ultimate Fighting Championship
Knockout of the Night (One time)

Mixed martial arts record

|-
| Loss
| align=center| 16–10 (3)
| Lew Long
| TKO (injury)
| Cage Warriors 83
| 
| align=center| 1
| align=center| 0:18
| Newport, Wales
|
|-
| Loss
| align=center| 16–9 (3)
| Matt Inman
| Submission (triangle choke)
| Cage Warriors: Unplugged
| 
| align=center| 2
| align=center| 4:09
| London, England
|
|-
|  NC
| align=center| 16–8 (3)
| Terry Montgomery
| NC (accidental illegal elbow)
| Venator FC 3
| 
| align=center| 1
| align=center|2:58
| Milan, Italy
|
|-
| Loss
| align=center| 16–8 (2)
| Jack Marshman
| TKO (punches)
| Cage Warriors 72
| 
| align=center| 2
| align=center| 1:32
| Newport, Wales, United Kingdom
| 
|-
| Win
| align=center| 16–7 (2)
| Leeroy Barnes 
| Submission (rear-naked choke)
| Cage Warriors 68
| 
| align=center| 1
| align=center| 4:46
| Liverpool, England
| 
|-
| Loss
| align=center| 15–7 (2)
| Faycal Hucin
| TKO (punches)
| CWFC Fight Night 9
| 
| align=center| 2
| align=center| 4:23
| Amman, Jordan
| 
|-
| Loss
| align=center| 15–6 (2)
| Cathal Pendred
| TKO (corner stoppage)
| CWFC 55
| 
| align=center| 3
| align=center| 1:47
| Dublin, Ireland
| 
|-
| NC
| align=center| 15–5 (2)
| Matthew Riddle
| NC (overturned)
| UFC on Fuel TV: Barão vs. McDonald
| 
| align=center| 3
| align=center| 5:00
| London, England
| 
|-
| Win
| align=center| 15–5 (1)
| Duane Ludwig
| TKO (knee injury)
| UFC on Fuel TV: Struve vs. Miocic
| 
| align=center| 1
| align=center| 2:28
| Nottingham, England
| 
|-
| Loss
| align=center| 14–5 (1)
| Rory MacDonald
| TKO (punches)
| UFC 145
| 
| align=center| 2
| align=center| 2:20
| Atlanta, Georgia, United States
| 
|-
| Win
| align=center| 14–4 (1)
| Chris Cope
| TKO (knees and punches)
| UFC 138
| 
| align=center| 1
| align=center| 0:40
| Birmingham, England, United Kingdom
| 
|-
| Win
| align=center| 13–4 (1)
| Marcio Cesar
| KO (punches)
| BAMMA 6: Watson vs. Rua
| 
| align=center| 1
| align=center| 4:05
| London, England, United Kingdom
| 
|-
| Win
| align=center| 12–4 (1)
| Magomed Shikhshabekov
| Decision (unanimous)
| M-1 Challenge 21: Guram vs. Garner
| 
| align=center| 4
| align=center| 5:00
| St. Petersburg, Leningrad Oblast, Russia
| 
|-
| Win
| align=center| 11–4 (1)
| Jake Hecht
| Decision (unanimous)
| Cage Warriors 38: Young Guns
| 
| align=center| 3
| align=center| 5:00
| North London, England, United Kingdom
| 
|-
| Win
| align=center| 10–4 (1)
| Manuel Garcia
| KO (knee)
| Cagemania: Carnage on the Costa
| 
| align=center| 1
| align=center| 0:09
| Benalmádena, Spain
| 
|-
| Loss
| align=center| 9–4 (1)
| Yuya Shirai
| Submission (armbar)
| Astra: Yoshida's Farewell
| 
| align=center| 1
| align=center| 3:59
| Tokyo, Japan
| 
|-
| Loss
| align=center| 9–3 (1)
| Jim Wallhead
| Decision (unanimous)
| KUMMA 3: Mills vs. Wallhead
| 
| align=center| 3
| align=center| 5:00
| Newport, Wales, United Kingdom
| 
|-
| Win
| align=center| 9–2 (1)
| Edgelson Lua
| Decision (unanimous)
| BAMMA 1
| 
| align=center| 3
| align=center| 5:00
| London, England, United Kingdom
| 
|-
| Win
| align=center| 8–2 (1)
| Aidan Marron
| TKO (submission to punches)
| KUMMA 1: Mills vs. Marron
| 
| align=center| 1
| align=center| N/A
| Wells, Somerset, England, United Kingdom
| 
|-
| Win
| align=center| 7–2 (1)
| Marius Žaromskis
| TKO (doctor stoppage)
| Cage Rage 26
| 
| align=center| 1
| align=center| 5:00
| London, United Kingdom
|
|-
| Win
| align=center| 6–2 (1)
| Ross Mason
| Submission (rear-naked choke)
| Cage Rage 23
| 
| align=center| 1
| align=center| 2:07
| London, England, United Kingdom
| 
|-
| Win
| align=center| 5–2 (1)
| Afnan Saeed
| TKO (punches)
| Cage Rage Contenders 5 
| 
| align=center| 1
| align=center| 1:22
| East London, United Kingdom
| 
|-
| Win
| align=center| 4–2 (1)
| Oriol Gaset
| Submission (rear-naked choke)
| CFS: D-Day
| 
| align=center| 1
| align=center| 1:22
| England, United Kingdom
| 
|-
| NC
| align=center| 3–2 (1)
| Paul Taylor
| NC (overturned)
| Cage Rage Contenders 3
| 
| align=center| 1
| align=center| 2:37
| London, England, United Kingdom
| 
|-
| Win
| align=center| 3–2
| Marius Žaromskis
| KO (knee)
| Cage Rage Contenders 2
| 
| align=center| 1
| align=center| 4:49
| Streatham, South London, United Kingdom
| 
|-
| Win
| align=center| 2–2
| Ross Mason
| TKO (punches)
| AM 9: Southern Agrrression 4 
| 
| align=center| 1
| align=center| 0:23
| Weston-super-Mare, England, United Kingdom
| 
|-
| Loss
| align=center| 1–2
| Pedro Bessa
| Submission (americana)
| AM 5: Southern Agrrression 2 
| 
| align=center| 1
| align=center| N/A
| Weston-super-Mare, England, United Kingdom
| 
|-
| Win
| align=center| 1–1
| Chris Taylor
| Submission (guillotine choke)
| UK: Storm
| 
| align=center| 1
| align=center| 0:23
| Birmingham, England, United Kingdom
| 
|-
| Loss
| align=center| 0–1
| Matt Thorpe
| Submission (armbar)
| XFC 2: The Perfect Storm 
| 
| align=center| 1
| align=center| 0:42
| Cornwall, England, United Kingdom
|

References

External links

 
Che Mills’s MySpace Profile

Living people
English male mixed martial artists
Welterweight mixed martial artists
Sportspeople from Gloucester
1982 births
Ultimate Fighting Championship male fighters